Gary Maley (born 3 August 1982) is a Scottish professional football coach and former player, who is the goalkeeping coach at Livingston.  He played as a goalkeeper for Scottish Premiership side Livingston.

Club career
Maley's early playing career saw him play at Broxburn Athletic alongside David Martindale and Scott Pittman.

An engineer by trade, Maley only signed his first contract in 2016, as backup to Livingston goalkeeper Liam Kelly. He spent a loan spell with Cowdenbeath in 2018, making 1 league appearance for them.

In 2020, Maley went viral after Livingston set up a Twitter poll asking the public whether his contract should be extended. Club manager David Martindale had initially pledged to donate £1 to the John O'Byrne Foundation for every vote cast, with Maley also donating two months' wages, but with the poll eventually reaching 180,000 votes, Martindale instead limited his donation to £1,000.

Maley had two short emergency loan spells at Queen of the South in 2021.

After another loan spell with Clyde in early 2022, Maley made his debut for Livingston in May, six years after signing for the club, as a substitute in a match against Dundee. At the age of 39 years, 285 days old, Maley became the oldest player to make his debut in the Scottish Premiership (or Scottish Premier League) since at least 1998.

Coaching career
Maley retired as a player at the end of the 2021–22 season and was appointed First Team Goalkeeping Coach at Livingston.

References

1982 births
Living people
Scottish footballers
Association football goalkeepers
Livingston F.C. players
Clyde F.C. players
Broxburn Athletic F.C. players
Cowdenbeath F.C. players
Queen of the South F.C. players
Scottish Professional Football League players